Anna Lise Phillips (Australia, 1975) is an Australian actress. She is sometimes credited as Anna Lise, Anna Lise Philips, or Anna-Lise Phillips.

Early life 
Phillips grew up in Darwin in the Northern Territory of Australia where she was a founding member of the Corrugated Iron Youth Theatre. Her mother was Maggi Phillips, a dancer
.

Career 
Philips' first major film role was in The Boys (1998) shortly followed by Envy (also known as The New Girlfriend) for which she was nominated for an AACTA Award for Best Supporting Actor in a Feature Film. Other films of note include Sundance award-winning; Animal Kingdom, Walking on Water, BackTrack, The Pack, A Wreck a Tangle, and The Tank.

In 2002 Phillips played Mabel Fine in Icon's telemovie The Three Stooges with Michael Chiklis, Paul Ben Victor, and Evan Handler.

Phillips first acted on television in 2002, starring in Channel 9's Young Lions. In 2009, she appeared as Jeneana Palmer in Channel Seven's TV soap opera Home and Away.

Phillips has appeared in many Australian TV series including McLeod's Daughters, The Secret Life of Us, Farscape, Stingers, Murder Call, Good Guys Bad Guys, Water Rats, Wildside, The Killing Field, Heartbreak High, Terra Nova, Bastard Boys, Crownies, City Homicide.

In 2012, she was cast in a recurring role in the American television series Revolution. Phillips starred in Foxtel's 2014 miniseries Devil's Playground with Toni Collette. In 2016, she starred in US comedy Sensitivity Training, which was also shown at The Los Angeles Film Festival. In 2020, Phillips made a guest appearance in Neighbours as Jenna Donaldson.

Filmography

Film

Television

References

External links
 

Australian film actresses
Australian television actresses
Living people
National Institute of Dramatic Art alumni
Actresses from the Northern Territory
1975 births